The 15th Empire Awards ceremony (officially known as the Jameson Empire Awards), presented by the British film magazine Empire, honored the best films of 2009 and took place on 28 March 2010 at the Grosvenor House Hotel in London, England. During the ceremony, Empire presented Empire Awards in 11 categories as well as four honorary awards. The Done In 60 Seconds competition was opened for the first time to international entries from this year. Irish comedian Dara Ó Briain hosted the show for the second consecutive year. The awards were sponsored by Jameson Irish Whiskey for the second consecutive year.

In related events, Empire and Jameson Irish Whiskey held the 1st Done In 60 Seconds Competition Global Final on 26 March 2010 at 24 Club, London, England. The team of judges consisted of Empire editor-in-chief Mark Dinning, English actor Jason Issacs and English film director and television director Edgar Wright, which selected from a shortlist of 20 nominees the five Done In 60 Seconds Award finalists that were invited to the Empire Awards where the winner was announced.

Avatar won the most awards with three including Best Film and Best Director for James Cameron. Other winners included Harry Brown, In the Loop, Inglourious Basterds, Let the Right One In, Nowhere Boy, Sherlock Holmes and Star Trek with one. Jude Law received the Empire Hero Award, Ian McKellen received the Empire Icon Award, Andy Serkis received the Empire Inspiration Award and Ray Winstone received the Outstanding Contribution to British Film award. Mark Wong from the United Kingdom won the Done In 60 Seconds Award for his 60-second film version of Top Gun.

Empire employee Kat Brown pioneered photolurking in the background of a picture with Rupert Grint.

Winners and nominees
Winners are listed first and highlighted in boldface.

Notes

Multiple awards
The following film received multiple awards:

Multiple nominations
The following 13 films received multiple nominations:

Done In 60 Seconds films

References

External links
 
 

Empire Award ceremonies
2009 film awards
2010 in London
2010 in British cinema
March 2010 events in the United Kingdom
2010s in the City of Westminster